Immanuel Vasanth Dinakaran (born 24 January 1983), better known as D. Imman, is an Indian film composer and singer, predominantly working in Tamil cinema. Also worked in Kannada, Malayalam, Telugu, and Hindi film industry. His first film as music director was Thamizhan in 2002. Since then he has composed music for more than 100 films. He is the fifth Tamil music composer to win the National Film Award for Best Music Direction. He has also won the Filmfare Awards South and he has received 4 Filmfare Awards South nominations. He has also won 1 Tamil Nadu State Film Award, 2 Vijay Awards, 1 Edison Award, 1 Ananda Vikadan Cinema Award and 1 Zee Tamil Award. D. Imman is appointed as the Ambassador for Tamil Chair in University Of Toronto, Canada (2019).

Career
Imman began work on music for films aged 15, apprenticing under music composers Mahesh Mahadevan and Adithyan by playing the keyboard. During this period, his work was noticed by television serial producer Kutty Padmini, who gave him the opportunity to work on the theme song and background music for the drama Krishnadasi, which began running in 2000. He subsequently began to get further work in the television circuit, garnering opportunities to score music for  Kolangal, Police Diary and Mandhira Vaasal. Kutty Padmini then gave him the chance to score music and compose songs for his first feature film, Kaadhale Swasam, a romantic film featuring Karthik and Meena.  Producer Venkateswaran, was impressed with Imman's work in the album, and gave him the opportunity to compose the music for Thamizhan (2002). The album won positive reviews, with the composer also featuring the voices of the lead actors Vijay and Priyanka Chopra for a particular song.

The success of individual songs such as "Azhagiya Asura" from Whistle (2003) made him popular. His next album was for Sundar C's masala film starring Arjun, Giri (2004), with the song Dai Kaiyaa Vechukittu being well received with the town and rural audiences.

The positive reviews that his work in Prabhu Solomon's Mynaa (2010) received, coupled with the film's box office success prompted bigger offers for Imman. He has subsequently collaborated with Prabhu Solomon for the rest of his trilogy of romantic films, earning acclaim for his work in Kumki (2012) and Kayal (2014). Similarly he has struck a similar successful combination with director Suseenthiran, winning positive reviews for his work on Pandianadu (2013) and Jeeva (2014). He teamed up with Actor Vijay again for Jilla(2014). Imman is the composer of Ajithkumar, Nayanthara starrer blockbuster Viswasam (2019). He also worked as a music composer for several films with Actor Sivakarthikeyan (Manam Kothi Paravai, Varuthapadatha Valibar Sangam, Rajinimurugan, Seemaraj, and Namma Veettu Pillai). Also he worked as a music composer for Annaatthe collaborating with Rajinikanth for the first time.

Awards
D.Imman has received several awards and recognitions for his work in the South Indian film musical world. He has been awarded the Kalaimamani award by the Government of Indian state Tamil Nadu in 2021.

Filmography
As composer

Upcoming projects

As singer

Television
He has mostly composed music for Sun TV serials.
Serials

Shows
Movie No.1 (Jaya TV)
Thakathimitha (Jaya TV)
Jackpot (Jaya TV)

References

External links

 

Loyola College, Chennai alumni
Indian male singers
Living people
Tamil film score composers
Tamil musicians
Don Bosco schools alumni
1983 births
Indian male film score composers
Best Music Direction National Film Award winners